The Cyprus University of Technology (CUT) ( or "ΤΕ.ΠΑ.Κ.") is a university established in 2004. Its first intake of students took place in the academic year 2007–08. The establishment of CUT is an attempt to fill in gaps that still exist within Cyprus' higher education by offering degrees in undergraduate and post graduate levels that are not offered by the University of Cyprus or by other higher education institutions.

It is based in Limassol, the second largest city in Cyprus. It was officially inaugurated in September 2007 by then-President of Cyprus, Tassos Papadopoulos.

University rankings 

According to recent international rankings, Cyprus University of Technology is ranked:

 Among the top 300-350 Universities in the Times Higher Education World University Rankings 2018-2019

Faculties and Departments 
The University consists of six faculties and a Language Center:
  Faculty of Geotechnical Sciences and Environmental Management
 Department of Agricultural Sciences, Biotechnology and Food Science
 Chemical Engineering Programme in collaboration with the Department of Engineering and Technology
 Faculty of Management and Economics
 Department of Hotel and Tourism Management
 Department of Commerce, Finance and Shipping
 Interdisciplinary Management Programme 
 Faculty of Communication and Media Studies
 Department of Communication and Internet Studies
 Department of Public Communication
 Faculty of Health Sciences
 Department of Nursing
 Department of Rehabilitation Sciences
 Cyprus International Institute for Environmental and Public Health
 Faculty of Fine and Applied Arts
 Department of Multimedia and Graphic Arts
 Department of Fine Arts
 Faculty of Engineering and Technology
 Department of Electrical Engineering, Computer Engineering and Informatics
 Department of Mechanical Engineering and Materials Science and Engineering
 Department of Civil Engineering and Geomatics
 Language Centre

International relations 
The Cyprus University of Technology is one of the eight holders of the European University of Technology, EUt+, with the Riga Technical University (Latvia), Technical University of Sofia (Bulgaria), the Hochschule Darmstadt, University of Applied Sciences (Germany), the Technological University Dublin (Ireland), the Polytechnic University of Cartagena (Spain), the University of Technology of Troyes (France), and the Technical University of Cluj-Napoca (Romania).

The European University of Technology, EUt+ is the result of the alliance of eight European partners who share in common the "Think Human First" vision towards a human-centred approach to technology and the ambition to establish a new type of institution on a confederal basis.

Through EUt+, the partners are committed to creating a sustainable future for students and learners in European countries, for the staff of each of the institutions and for the territories and regions where each campus is anchored.

References

External links
 

Universities and colleges in Cyprus
Educational institutions established in 2004
2004 establishments in Cyprus